Joel Rudnick (born June 27, 1936) is an American painter and sculptor.

Originally from Brooklyn, New York, Rudnick received his initial training as a painter at the Art Students League of New York. He was a protégé of Shelly Fink and studied with the caricaturist and painter David Levine on a scholarship at the Brooklyn Museum Art School. Rudnick also studied sculpture at the National Academy School of Art and Design in New York City. Later in life he made the Berkshires his home.

Joel Rudnick re-modeled the falcon for the Central Park statue called The Falconer by George Blackall Simonds.  The remodeling occurred in the late 60s although, due to lack of funds, it wasn't actually cast and mounted until 1982.

The bulk of Rudnick's paintings are impressionistic landscapes of the Berkshires, which he has called home for most of his adult life. His sculptures, mostly nudes, depict people in various stages of life or in their loving interactions with each other.

Awards
Elizabeth T. Greenshields Memorial Foundation Grant, Montreal, Canada
Joel Meisner Foundry Prize, Salmagundi Club, NYC
Lindsay Morris memorial Award, Allied Artists of America, NYC
Mrs. Louis Bennett Prize, National Sculpture Society
The Louis La Baume Memorial Prize
Harriet Whitney Frismuth Prize, National Academy School of Fine Arts
Honorable mentions from the National Sculpture Society and Allied Artists of America

External links
Joel Rudnick Official Web Site

References

Living people
1936 births
20th-century American painters
American male painters
21st-century American painters
20th-century American sculptors
20th-century American male artists
American male sculptors